Geoff Morrell may refer to:
Geoff Morrell (actor) (born 1958), Australian actor
Geoff Morrell (spokesperson) (born 1968), former chief spokesman to the US Secretary of Defense